Fatemeh Karamzadeh (born 26 November 1998) is an Iranian sport shooter, born in Khorramshahr but immigrated to Bushehr in childhood. She represented Iran at the 2020 Summer Olympics in Tokyo 2021, competing in women's 10 metre air rifle and in Women's 50 metre rifle three positions.

Her residence is in Bushehr.

Olympic results

References

External links 
 

1998 births
Living people
People from Bushehr
Iranian female sport shooters
Shooters at the 2020 Summer Olympics
Olympic shooters of Iran
People from Khorramshahr
Sportspeople from Khuzestan province
21st-century Iranian women